Wendy Irving (born 11 November 1951) is a Canadian equestrian. She competed in two events at the 1972 Summer Olympics.

References

External links
 

1951 births
Living people
Canadian female equestrians
Olympic equestrians of Canada
Equestrians at the 1972 Summer Olympics
Sportspeople from Ottawa
Equestrians at the 1971 Pan American Games
Pan American Games medalists in equestrian
Pan American Games gold medalists for Canada
Medalists at the 1971 Pan American Games
20th-century Canadian women
21st-century Canadian women